Bag & Baggage Productions is a professional theatre company based in Hillsboro, in the U.S. state of Oregon. Founded in 2005, the non-profit group presents about four productions per year. Their home venue is "The Vault", a theater located in a former bank building in downtown Hillsborough, on East Main Street.

History

The company was co-founded in 2005 by several actors, including Scott Palmer, who graduated from Hillsboro High School in 1986. In the early years Bag & Baggage was a traveling theater group, making stops in communities around Oregon. Performances in Hillsboro were held at the Cornelius Pass Roadhouse and the Glenn & Viola Walters Cultural Arts Center. Other venues included the Hotel Oregon in McMinnville and the Withycombe Theatre in Corvallis, among others.

Through May 2008 the company had put on nine productions. In September 2008, Bag & Baggage became the resident theater company at the Venetian Theatre in Downtown Hillsboro. They opened their new season with Steel Magnolias. The Venetian had opened in June of that year in the space that had been a movie theater, but had sat vacant since 1996.

Season ticket sales stood at 220 for the 2007 to 2008 season, and grew to 450 for the 2008 to 2009 season. At the end of 2008 Bag & Baggage was only the second professional group for live theater in Washington County, the other being the Broadway Rose Theatre Company of Tigard. For Christmas in 2008, the theater company produced The Eight: Reindeer Monologues with four shows held at the Venetian.

In July 2009, the company put on the first outdoor Shakespeare production by professionals ever held in the city. Held at the plaza in front of the Hillsboro Civic Center, the play was Romeo and Juliet, with the production paid for in part by the city. In December 2009, they produced an adaptation of Charles Dickens' A Christmas Carol.

Bag & Baggage produced William Shakespeare's The Taming of the Shrew and John Fletcher's retort to that play, The Woman's Prize, in a combined play in February 2010. Theater critic Bob Hicks, writing about the performances for The Oregonian, said "... Bag & Baggage's doubleheader is more engaging in concept than onstage. As stimulating as the idea is, and as fun as the whole thing is in fits and starts, the carry-through can get tedious... ...too many balls in the air, not enough ease in the juggling...". Their version of Tennessee Williams' The Glass Menagerie later that year received a positive review by Holly Danks of The Oregonian.

Bag and Baggage hosted an Oscar party in March 2010 to show the 82nd Academy Awards live at the Venetian Theatre. The company hoped to make it an annual fundraiser and become an official Oscar party sanction by the Academy of Motion Picture Arts and Sciences. Creative director Scott Palmer's adaptation of Dickens' A Christmas Carol was labeled as imaginative by Carol Wells in her review for The Oregonian in December 2011. The group was awarded $11,600 by the Regional Arts & Culture Council in July 2012, and introduced an adaptation of Shakespeare's Titus Andronicus entitled Kabuki Titus that borrowed elements from Kabuki theater. They collaborated with the Tears of Joy Theatre in December 2012 for an adaptation of The Velveteen Rabbit.

Productions
Bag & Baggage usually produces four plays each season, though they have had as many as seven in a single season. Although the resident theater company at the Venetian Theatre in Hillsboro, the group also performs at venues around Washington County including the fairgrounds, the Cornelius Pass Roadhouse, and the Kingstad Center (now closed), among others. Productions staged by the company have included The Importance of Being Earnest, Infinite Variety, Death of a Salesman, and others.

Bag and Baggage primarily puts on classic American and British dramas. The non-profit group is governed by a fourteen-member board of directors. The artistic director is Scott Palmer and Audra Petrie Veber serves as the production manager. They adopted the name of the company due to their early history as a traveling troupe. Bag and Baggage also helps educate local students about theater, including providing tickets to county high school students.

Awards and recognition 
In 2015, Bag & Baggage was awarded the American Theatre Wing's National Theatre Company Grant.

See also
Hillsboro Artists' Regional Theatre

References

External links
Oregon Arts Commission
Hillsboro theater company comes of age - News-Times
Bag and Baggage website

2005 establishments in Oregon
Community theatre
Entertainment companies established in 2005
Culture of Hillsboro, Oregon
Theatre companies in Oregon